Presley Askew (November 17, 1909 – February 7, 1994) was an American basketball and baseball coach. Overall Askew won 169 games at New Mexico State and Arkansas and had an overall record of 509–312 in all high school and college coaching. Born in Red Oak, Oklahoma, Askew played basketball and graduated from Red Oak High School in 1926. He played for and graduated from Eastern Oklahoma State College, and eventually Oklahoma State University in 1930. He began coaching at Fanshawe Public School and became head varsity coach in 1932. In 1937 Askew moved to his hometown Red Oak High School to coach and was there until 1942 when he moved on to Van Buren High School in Arkansas. Askew's teams at Van Buren were very competitive and went to the state championship tournaments.

In 1947 Askew accepted an assistant coaching position at Arkansas and the following year was named the head coach. In his first season he tied for first in the Southwest Conference. The following two seasons were not as good and he was fired. Askew coached at Connors State College the next season before being hired as the head basketball and baseball coach at what was then New Mexico A&M in 1953.

Askew coached New Mexico State for twelve seasons that included three Border Conference championships and two NCAA tournament appearances. He resigned after the 1964–65 season.

New Mexico State dedicated their baseball field as Presley Askew Field in 1981 in honor of their former coach.

Askew was awarded the NABC Merit and Honor awards in 1977. He died on February 7, 1994, at the age of 84 in Las Cruces, New Mexico.

Head coaching record

College basketball

References

1909 births
1994 deaths
Arkansas Razorbacks men's basketball coaches
Basketball coaches from Oklahoma
College men's basketball head coaches in the United States
High school basketball coaches in Arkansas
New Mexico State Aggies athletic directors
New Mexico State Aggies baseball coaches
New Mexico State Aggies men's basketball coaches
People from Le Flore County, Oklahoma